The Woyie River Diamond was recovered on 6 January 1945 from the Woyie River  near Koidu in eastern Sierra Leone. The alluvial Star of Sierra Leone, discovered at the Diminco mine in Sierra Leone in 1970, is larger at  uncut. 

The rough diamond was brought to London, where it was viewed by Queen Mary in October 1947 and then exhibited at the British Industries Fair in May 1949.

The stone was cut by diamond cutters Briefel and Lemer in London (who also cut the Williamson pink diamond) into 30 gems weighing  in total, including 10 of over  each.  The largest of the gems is the Victory Diamond which is weighs  and is Emerald cut (occasionally described as "step cut").

Victory Diamond
The Victory Diamond is described by a GIA report as "D Colour, VVS2 Clarity, Type IIa".  The gemstone was acquired by Frank Jay Gould, son of railroad tycoon Jay Gould, for his third wife Florence (née La Caze) and sold after her death in 1983.  It was sold again at Sotheby's in Geneva in 2014, and is up for sale at Sotheby's in New York in 2015.

See also
List of diamonds
List of largest rough diamonds

References 

Diamonds originating in Sierra Leone